The Jewish Museum London is a museum of British Jewish life, history and identity. The museum is situated in Camden Town in the London Borough of Camden, North London. It is a place for people of all faiths to explore Jewish history, culture, and heritage. The museum has a dedicated education team, with a programme for schools, community groups and families. Charles III is a patron of the museum.

The events, programmes and activities at the museum aim to provoke questions, challenge prejudice, and encourage understanding.

History
The museum, a registered charity, was founded in 1932 in the Jewish communal headquarters in Bloomsbury. In 1995, it moved to its current location in Camden Town. Until 2007 it had a sister museum in Finchley, operated by the same charitable trust and sited within the Sternberg Centre. The Camden branch reopened in 2010 after two years of major building and extension work. The £10 million renovation was funded by the Heritage Lottery Fund and private donations.

The museum is in a row of buildings in Albert Street that have been listed Grade II by Historic England.

Collections

The museum houses a major international-level collection of Jewish ceremonial art including the Lindo lamp, an early example of a British Hanukkah menorah. The building includes a gallery entitled Judaism: A Living Faith, displaying the museum's noted collection of Jewish ceremonial art. This collection has been awarded "designated" status by the Museums, Libraries and Archives Council in recognition of its outstanding national importance. The museum's Holocaust Gallery includes items and filmed survivor testimony from Leon Greenman, who was one of the few British subjects to be interned in the death camps section at Auschwitz.

The museum also has exhibitions recounting the history of Jewish life in England, supported by a diverse collection of objects. There are also collections of paintings, prints and drawings, and an archive of photographs, which consists mainly of black and white photographs from the 1900s to the 1940s, along with militaria from the former Jewish Military Museum, which merged into it in January 2015.

Exhibitions
There are two temporary exhibition spaces. The third floor houses major exhibitions, with smaller exhibitions in the temporary exhibition space on the ground floor.

Previous exhibitions
  Asterix in Britain: The Life and Work of René Goscinny
 Elspeth Juda: Grit and Glamour
 Designs on Britain
 Scots Jews: Photographs by Judah Passow
 Shaping Ceramics: From Lucie Rie to Edmund de Waal
 Dorothy Bohm: Sixties London
 Moses, Mods and Mr Fish: The Menswear Revolution
 Through a Queer Lens: Portraits of LGBTQ Jews
 Blood: Uniting & Dividing
 Memory Quilts: Triumph Over Adversity
 Tiger, Mog and Pink Rabbit: a Judith Kerr Retrospective
 Your Jewish Museum: Love, Journeys and Sacrifice
 Blackguards in Bonnets
 For Richer, For Poorer: Weddings Unveiled
 Designing the 20th Century: Life and Work of Abram Games
 For King and Country? The Jewish Experience of the First World War
 Four Four Jew: Football, Fans and Faith
 Amy Winehouse: A Family Portrait
 R.B. Kitaj: Obsessions – The Art of Identity
 Morocco: Photographs by Elias Harrus and Pauline Prior
 Entertaining the Nation: Stars of Music, Stage and Screen 
 No Place Like Home
 World City: Refugee Stories 
 Ludwig Guttmann: Father of the Paralympic Games 
 Adi Nes: The Village
 Roman Vishniac Rediscovered, presented simultaneously at The Photographers' Gallery.
 Jews, Money, Myth, exploring antisemitic imagery linking Jews with money. Alongside manifestations of antisemitic imagery dating back to Judas and Thirty pieces of silver, the exhibit featured a display case of the popular Polish "Lucky Jew" figurines.
 Charlotte Salomon: Life? or Theatre?

See also
History of the Jews in England

References

External links

Jewish Museum London within Google Arts & Culture

1932 establishments in England
Art museums and galleries in London
Camden Town
Charities based in London
Ethnic museums in the United Kingdom
Grade II listed buildings in the London Borough of Camden
Grade II listed museum buildings
Camden Jewish Museum
Museums established in 1932
Museums in the London Borough of Camden